Callan Stuart "Cal" Brunker (born November 16, 1978) is a Canadian animator, storyboard artist, screenwriter, and film director. He is best known for directing The Weinstein Company's animated film Escape from Planet Earth (2013), The Nut Job 2: Nutty by Nature (2017), and Nickelodeon's PAW Patrol: The Movie (2021), all are in collaboration with his business partner Bob Barlen, who served as a co-writer for these films.

Career
Cal Brunker has frequently collaborated with his partner Bob Barlen since 2009's Ollie & the Baked Halibut, who has later written films alongside since. Before his directorial debut in Ninjamaica and then 2013's Escape from Planet Earth, Brunker has worked as a storyboard artist and an animator on films such as Looney Tunes: Back in Action, Horton Hears a Who!, and Despicable Me. He directed films such as Escape from Planet Earth and The Nut Job 2: Nutty by Nature. Brunker and Barlen have written screenplays for Arctic Dogs, Cranston Academy: Monster Zone, and The Son of Bigfoot in which they co-executive produced.

He also directed the film PAW Patrol: The Movie, a feature film adaptation of Nick Jr.'s PAW Patrol animated series. Serving as the director and co-writer and once more collaborating with Barlen alongside Billy Frolick, it was produced by Spin Master and Nickelodeon Movies, and released by Paramount Pictures in August 2021.

Filmography

Film

Television

See also
Bob Barlen

References

External links
 
 
 Cal Brunker's Twitter

Canadian animated film directors
Canadian male screenwriters
Canadian storyboard artists
21st-century Canadian screenwriters
Living people
1975 births